The 1993 Pacific typhoon season has no official bounds; it ran year-round in 1993, but most tropical cyclones tend to form in the northwestern Pacific Ocean between May and November. These dates conventionally delimit the period of each year when most tropical cyclones form in the northwestern Pacific Ocean.

Tropical Storms formed in the entire west pacific basin were assigned a name by the Joint Typhoon Warning Center. Tropical depressions in this basin have the "W" suffix added to their number. Tropical depressions that enter or form in the Philippine area of responsibility are assigned a name by the Philippine Atmospheric, Geophysical and Astronomical Services Administration or PAGASA. This can often result in the same storm having two names.

Season summary

Systems 
40 tropical cyclones formed this year in the Western Pacific, of which 30 became tropical storms. 15 storms reached typhoon intensity, of which 3 reached super typhoon strength.

Tropical Depression 01W (Atring) 

Tropical Depression 01W formed on February 27, 1993, near the Philippines. The storm made landfall on Mindanao on March 1, before it dissipated the next day.

Severe Tropical Storm Irma 

Irma shied away from land masses.

Tropical Depression 03W (Bining) 

It formed on April 9 east of Mindanao. It made landfall on Mindanao on April 13 and dissipated later that day.

Tropical Depression 04W (Kuring) 

It formed on April 15, 1993. Curving twice, it made landfall on Mindanao. It is the third storm to make landfall in Mindanao this season.

Tropical Depression Daling 

The PAGASA classified the depression as 'Daling' on May 3 as it made landfall over southern Mindanao the next day. It dissipated in the Sulu Sea on May 4.

Tropical Depression Jack 

Jack stayed at sea.

Super Typhoon Koryn (Goring) 

Typhoon Koryn, having developed well east of the Philippines on June 13, steadily strengthened as it moved westward, intensifying to a peak of  winds on the 24th. It crossed northern Luzon the next day as a slightly weaker  typhoon, and continued west-northwestward until hitting southern China (90 nautical miles southwest of Hong Kong on the 27th). Koryn slowly wound down, bringing heavy rain through China and northern Vietnam before dissipating on the 29th. Koryn was responsible for the loss of 37 people, as well as $14.5 million (1993 USD) in damage over the northern Philippines.

Tropical Depression 07W (Elang) 

Elang made landfall in the Philippines.

Severe Tropical Storm Lewis (Huling) 

Lewis was one of many systems to hit the Philippines that year.

Tropical Storm Marian (Ibiang) 

Marian stayed within the Philippine Sea.

Severe Tropical Storm Nathan 

Nathan crossed Japan. 47 were killed in Kochi Prefecture.

Tropical Storm Ofelia (Luming) 

Ofelia moved over Japan.

Severe Tropical Storm Percy (Miling) 

Percy also struck Japan.

Tropical Depression Narsing 

On July 29, PAGASA initiated advisories on a poorly organised tropical depression. The depression moved slowly towards the north-west before it dissipated during the next day.

Typhoon Robyn (Openg) 

The near equatorial trough spawned a tropical depression on July 30 over the open Western Pacific waters. It tracked to the west-northwest, becoming a tropical storm on the 2nd and a typhoon on the 4th. Robyn turned more to the northwest, where it reached a peak intensity of  winds on the 7th. It weakened to a  typhoon before hitting southwestern Japan on the 9th, and became extratropical on the 10th over the Sea of Japan. Robyn caused 45 fatalities, 39 of which were from traffic related accidents, and $68 million in damage (1993 USD).

Severe Tropical Storm Steve (Pining) 

Steve stayed clear from land.

Tropical Depression 15W

Typhoon Tasha (Rubing) 

Tasha hit China in August.

Typhoon Keoni 

Keoni formed southeast of the Big Island of Hawaii on August 9, and was later classified as a named system south of the island chain. Keoni peaked as an intense Category 4 hurricane over open waters and lasted until the 29th, crossing the International Date Line and becoming a typhoon in the western Pacific, but never affected land.

Typhoon Vernon 

The cyclone dropped heavy rainfall across much of the Japanese archipelago. Vernon caused 2 fatalities and 4 injuries.

Tropical Storm Winona (Saling) 

Winona hit China and Vietnam.

Super Typhoon Yancy (Tasing) 

The monsoon trough formed a tropical depression on August 27. It headed generally westward, reaching tropical storm strength on the 30th and typhoon strength on the 31st. Yancy turned to the northeast, where it rapidly intensified to a  super typhoon on the 2nd. The storm weakened to a  typhoon before making landfall on southwestern Japan on the 3rd, and dissipated 2 days later over the Sea of Japan. Yancy brought strong winds to Japan, amounting to 42 casualties and widespread damage.

Severe Tropical Storm Zola (Unsing) 

Zola was another weak system that hit Japan.

Typhoon Abe (Walding) 

Abe was another Typhoon that hit China.

Severe Tropical Storm Becky (Yeyeng) 

Becky struck China to the west of Macau at full force. The offshore waters in the southern and southwestern part of Hong Kong recorded hurricane-force winds where its hourly mean winds reached 122 km/h with gusts up to 176 km/h at Waglan Island. In Cheung Chau, winds increased significantly to 115 km/h hourly before under going maintenance; privately recorded its hourly winds of up to 128 km/h during its first hour of maintenance there in Cheung Chau, and up to 139 km/h 60-minute mean wind just before under going maintenance. In Tai Mo Shan, its hourly mean winds reached 155 km/h.

Becky was clearly underestimated and the hurricane signal 10 should have been hoisted as it was justified (hurricane-force winds recorded at southwestern part of Hong Kong when Becky traversed at about 110 km south-southwest of the Royal Observatory). Its maximum 10 minute sustained wind speed was estimated to be at around 150 km/h at its closet approach to Hong Kong.

The typhoon killed 1 taxi driver at a car accident in Hong Kong.
As of 2017, Becky was revised and upgraded to a minimal typhoon.

Typhoon Dot (Anding) 

Dot struck China as well.
Initially posing a direct hit to Hong Kong but it slowly moved north, striking the coast of western Guangdong.

Typhoon Cecil 

Cecil recurved out to sea.

Super Typhoon Ed (Dinang) 

Ed was a potent typhoon but did not affect land. It was also the only Category 5 of the season.

Typhoon Flo (Kadiang) 

Typhoon Flo hit the northern Philippines on October 4 as a minimal typhoon, having developed on the 28th from the monsoon trough. It stalled just off the west coast, and turned northeastward, becoming extratropical on the 9th. Flo caused at least 500 deaths from the heavy flooding on Luzon. Flo interacted with the nearby Ed, causing Flo to recurve  eastwards. Flo’s recurving resulted prolonged rainfall across Luzon.

Tropical Storm Gene (Gundang) 

Gene was a weak system that stayed away from land.

Tropical Depression 28W (Epang) 

The depression criss crossed land.

Severe Tropical Storm Hattie 

Hattie recurved from land.

Typhoon Ira (Husing) 

Ira struck the Philippines. It also wreaked havoc in Hong Kong, causing an aircraft to slide off the runway at Kai Tak Airport after landing in blind weather.

Tropical Storm Jeana 

Jeana stayed at sea.

Tropical Depression 32W (Indang) 

32W was long-lived.

Tropical Depression 33W 

33W was short-lived.

Typhoon Kyle (Luring) 

Kyle was yet another Philippines striking system. It also hit Vietnam.

Typhoon Lola (Monang) 

The near equatorial trough spawned a tropical depression on November 27. It moved westward without significant development until December 2, when it became a tropical storm. Lola became a typhoon 2 days later, and hit the Philippines on the 5th. It weakened to a tropical storm after crossing the islands, but restrengthened to a  typhoon before hitting southern Vietnam on the 8th. Lola quickly dissipated, not after causing 308 fatalities, 230 of which were in the Philippines from the heavy rains.

Typhoon Manny (Naning) 

Manny, like Lola, developed from the near-equatorial trough on December 1. It headed westward, slowly strengthening to a tropical storm on the 4th. Due to a ridge to the north, it looped on the 7th and 8th and became a typhoon on the way. While heading southwestward towards the Philippines, Manny rapidly intensified to a  typhoon before hitting the Philippines late on the 9th. It weakened over the islands, and upper level winds kept it from restrengthening much over the South China Sea. Manny dissipated on the 16th over the Malay Peninsula, after causing 230 deaths, only one week after Lola hit the same area.

Manny's track was unusual, given its time of year with a loop and a strengthening period to the southwest. However, it has a near-perfect analog; Typhoon Pamela in the 1982 Pacific typhoon season took a nearly identical track within days of Manny (though Pamela was much weaker than Manny).

Tropical Depression Oning 

A non-tropical system developed from the ITCZ of where Manny formed on December 11. It moved in a fairly fast westward direction as it gradually intensified into a weak tropical depression late on December 14. The PAGASA issued warnings on the depression as it reached peak intensity late on December 15, making landfall over the islands of Visayas.

Severe Tropical Storm Nell (Puring) 

Nell was the final system to hit the Philippines this year. 46 people were found dead due to Nell.

Storm names 
During the season 28 named tropical cyclones developed in the Western Pacific and were named by the Joint Typhoon Warning Center, when it was determined that they had become tropical storms. These names were contributed to a revised list which started on mid-1989.

Philippines 

The Philippine Atmospheric, Geophysical and Astronomical Services Administration uses its own naming scheme for tropical cyclones in their area of responsibility. PAGASA assigns names to tropical depressions that form within their area of responsibility and any tropical cyclone that might move into their area of responsibility. Should the list of names for a given year prove to be insufficient, names are taken from an auxiliary list, the first 6 of which are published each year before the season starts. Names not retired from this list will be used again in the 1997 season. This is the same list used for the 1989 season. PAGASA uses its own naming scheme that starts in the Filipino alphabet, with names of Filipino female names ending with "ng" (A, B, K, D, etc.).

Season effects 
This table summarizes all the systems that developed within or moved into the North Pacific Ocean, to the west of the International Date Line during 1993. The tables also provide an overview of a systems intensity, duration, land areas affected and any deaths or damages associated with the system.

|-
| 01W (Atring) ||  || bgcolor=#| || bgcolor=#| || bgcolor=#| || Philippines || None || None ||
|-
| Irma ||  || bgcolor=#| || bgcolor=#| || bgcolor=#| || Marshall Islands, Caroline Islands ||  None ||  ||
|-
| 03W (Bining) ||  || bgcolor=#| || bgcolor=#| || bgcolor=#| || Caroline Islands, Philippines || None || None ||
|-
| 04W (Kuring) ||  || bgcolor=#| || bgcolor=#| || bgcolor=#| || Caroline Islands, Philippines || None || None ||
|-
| Daling ||  || bgcolor=#| || bgcolor=#| || bgcolor=#| || Philippines || None || None ||
|-
| Jack ||  || bgcolor=#| || bgcolor=#| || bgcolor=#| || Caroline Islands, Mariana Islands || None || None ||
|-
| Koryn (Goring) ||  || bgcolor=#| || bgcolor=#| || bgcolor=#| || Caroline Islands, Philippines, China ||  ||  ||
|-
| 07W (Elang) ||  || bgcolor=#| || bgcolor=#| || bgcolor=#| || Philippines || None || None ||
|-
| Lewis (Huling) ||  || bgcolor=#| || bgcolor=#| || bgcolor=#| || Philippines, South China, Vietnam || Unknown || Unknown ||
|-
| TD ||  || bgcolor=#| || bgcolor=#| || bgcolor=#| || South China || None || None ||
|-
| Marian (Ibiang) ||  || bgcolor=#| || bgcolor=#| || bgcolor=#| || None || None || None ||
|-
| TD ||  || bgcolor=#| || bgcolor=#| || bgcolor=#| || None || None || None ||
|-
| Nathan ||  || bgcolor=#| || bgcolor=#| || bgcolor=#| || Mariana Islands, Japan || Unknown || Unknown ||
|-
| TD ||  || bgcolor=#| || bgcolor=#| || bgcolor=#| || None || None || None ||
|-
| Ofelia (Luming) ||  || bgcolor=#| || bgcolor=#| || bgcolor=#| || Japan || Unknown || Unknown ||
|-
| Percy (Miling) ||  || bgcolor=#| || bgcolor=#| || bgcolor=#| || Mariana Islands, Japan || Unknown || Unknown ||
|-
| Narsing ||  || bgcolor=#| || bgcolor=#| || bgcolor=#| || None || None || None ||
|-
| TD ||  || bgcolor=#| || bgcolor=#| || bgcolor=#| || Philippines, Taiwan || None || None ||
|-
| Robyn (Openg) ||  || bgcolor=#| || bgcolor=#| || bgcolor=#| || Caroline Islands, Mariana Islands, Japan, South Korea ||  ||  ||
|-
| Steve (Pining) ||  || bgcolor=#| || bgcolor=#| || bgcolor=#| || Mariana Islands, Ryukyu Islands || None || None ||
|-
| 15W ||  || bgcolor=#| || bgcolor=#| || bgcolor=#| || Marshall Islands || None || None ||
|-
| Tasha (Rubing) ||  || bgcolor=#| || bgcolor=#| || bgcolor=#| || Philippines, China || None || None ||
|-
| Keoni ||  || bgcolor=#| || bgcolor=#| || bgcolor=#| || None || None || None ||
|-
| Vernon ||  || bgcolor=#| || bgcolor=#| || bgcolor=#| || Japan || Unknown || 2 || 
|-
| Winona (Saling) ||  || bgcolor=#| || bgcolor=#| || bgcolor=#| || Philippines, Vietnam || Unknown || Unknown ||
|-
| TD ||  || bgcolor=#| || bgcolor=#| || bgcolor=#| || Mariana Islands || None || None ||
|-
| Yancy (Tasing) ||  || bgcolor=#| || bgcolor=#| || bgcolor=#| || Japan ||  ||  ||
|-
| Zola (Unsing) ||  || bgcolor=#| || bgcolor=#| || bgcolor=#| || Japan || None || None ||
|-
| TD ||  || bgcolor=#| || bgcolor=#| || bgcolor=#| || Philippines || None || None ||
|-
| Abe (Walding) ||  || bgcolor=#| || bgcolor=#| || bgcolor=#| || Philippines, Taiwan, China || Unknown || None ||
|-
| Becky (Yeyeng) ||  || bgcolor=#| || bgcolor=#| || bgcolor=#| || Philippines, South China || None || 1 ||
|-
| Dot (Anding) ||  || bgcolor=#| || bgcolor=#| || bgcolor=#| || Philippines, China || Unknown || None ||
|-
| Cecil ||  || bgcolor=#| || bgcolor=#| || bgcolor=#| || Mariana Islands || None || None ||
|-
| Binang ||  || bgcolor=#| || bgcolor=#| || bgcolor=#| || None || None || None ||
|-
| Ed (Dinang) ||  || bgcolor=#| || bgcolor=#| || bgcolor=#| || Caroline Islands, Mariana Islands || None || None ||
|-
| Flo (Kadiang) ||  || bgcolor=#| || bgcolor=#| || bgcolor=#| || Philippines, Ryukyu Islands || Unknown ||  ||
|-
| 28W (Epang) ||  || bgcolor=#| || bgcolor=#| || bgcolor=#| || Philippines, South China || None || None ||
|-
| Gene (Gundang) ||  || bgcolor=#| || bgcolor=#| || bgcolor=#| || Caroline Islands || None || None ||
|-
| Hattie ||  || bgcolor=#| || bgcolor=#| || bgcolor=#| || Marshall Islands || None || None ||
|-
| TD ||  || bgcolor=#| || bgcolor=#| || bgcolor=#| || None || None || None ||
|-
| Ira (Husing) ||  || bgcolor=#| || bgcolor=#| || bgcolor=#| || Caroline Islands, Mariana Islands, Philippines, China || Unknown || Unknown ||
|-
| Jeana ||  || bgcolor=#| || bgcolor=#| || bgcolor=#| || Caroline Islands || None || None ||
|-
| Indang ||  || bgcolor=#| || bgcolor=#| || bgcolor=#| || Philippines || None || None ||
|-
| 32W ||  || bgcolor=#| || bgcolor=#| || bgcolor=#| || Caroline Islands || None || None ||
|-
| 33W ||  || bgcolor=#| || bgcolor=#| || bgcolor=#| || Marshall Islands || None || None ||
|-
| Kyle (Luring) ||  || bgcolor=#| || bgcolor=#| || bgcolor=#| || Philippines, Vietnam, Cambodia || Unknown ||  ||
|-
| Lola (Monang) ||  || bgcolor=#| || bgcolor=#| || bgcolor=#| || Caroline Islands, Philippines, Vietnam, Cambodia || Unknown ||  ||
|-
| Manny (Naning) ||  || bgcolor=#| || bgcolor=#| || bgcolor=#| || Philippines, Vietnam, Thailand || Unknown ||  ||
|-
| Oning ||  || bgcolor=#| || bgcolor=#| || bgcolor=#| || Philippines || None || None ||
|-
| Nell (Puring) ||  || bgcolor=#| || bgcolor=#| || bgcolor=#| || Philippines || None || None ||
|-

See also 

 List of Pacific typhoon seasons
 1993 Pacific hurricane season
 1993 Atlantic hurricane season
 1993 North Indian Ocean cyclone season
 South-West Indian Ocean cyclone season: 1992–93, 1993–94
 Australian region cyclone season: 1992–93, 1993–94
 South Pacific cyclone season: 1992–93, 1993–94

References

External links 
 Japan Meteorological Agency
 Joint Typhoon Warning Center .
 China Meteorological Agency
 National Weather Service Guam
 Hong Kong Observatory
 Macau Meteorological Geophysical Services
 Korea Meteorological Agency
 Philippine Atmospheric, Geophysical and Astronomical Services Administration
 Taiwan Central Weather Bureau
 Satellite movie of 1993 Pacific typhoon season